Edinburgh University Boat Club (EUBC) is one of the oldest sports clubs of the University of Edinburgh, in the city of Edinburgh, Scotland.

Originally started in 1867 it has been going continuously ever since. The annual Edinburgh/Glasgow Boat Race first took place in 1877, ten years after the boat club started. As one of the largest rowing clubs in Scotland, it has over a hundred active members, with many crews competing at all levels. The club celebrated its 150th anniversary in 2017. The club is affiliated to Scottish Rowing. 

In May 2022, EUBC won the Victor Ludorum at the BUCS Regatta.

Facilities and training
The senior fleet is racked at Strathclyde Park, Scotland's purpose built regatta lake, where most water training takes place. Novice crews also row on the Union Canal in Edinburgh, which enables them to train on the water during the week.

Land training takes place in the Pleasance Centre for Sport and Exercise, which has weights rooms and a fleet of ergs in the purpose-built Katherine Grainger rowing gym.

Notable alumni
Katherine Grainger, Olympic rowing gold medalist and 4-time Olympic silver medalist
Dot Blackie, Olympic rower
Polly Swann, GB Rower, 2016 Olympic Silver Medalist, 2013 World Champion and 2014 European Champion
Alistair Potts, GB Coxswain, 2000 World Champion and Boat Race winner
Leslie Balfour-Melville, all-round sportsman
Maddie Arlett, GB lightweight sculler
Lucy Glover, GB rower, 2020 Olympian

Honours

National champions

Key- 2, 4, 8 (crew size), x (sculls), - (coxless), + (coxed)

Henley Royal Regatta

See also
University of Edinburgh
Edinburgh University Sports Union
University rowing (UK)

References

External links
 Edinburgh University Boat Club website
 Edinburgh University Sports Union

1867 establishments in Scotland
Sports clubs established in 1867
Sports teams in Edinburgh
Clubs and societies of the University of Edinburgh
University and college rowing clubs in Scotland
Rowing clubs in Scotland